Cathedral Hill Historic District may refer to:

 Cathedral Hill Historic District (Baltimore, Maryland), listed on the National Register of Historic Places (NRHP) in Maryland
 Cathedral Hill Historic District (St. Joseph, Missouri), listed on the NRHP in Buchanan County, Missouri

See also
Cathedral Historic District (disambiguation)
Cathedral Hill (disambiguation)